Marcela Robinson García (born 7 January 1997) is a Puerto Rican international footballer who plays as a central defender for the Puerto Rico women's national team.

International career
Robinson was eligible to play for the United States or Puerto Rico, as she was born in the States to a Puerto Rican mother.

Robinson debuted for Puerto Rico on 5 May 2018 against Anguilla.

International goals
Scores and results list Puerto Rico's goal tally first

References 

1997 births
Living people
Puerto Rican women's footballers
Puerto Rico women's international footballers
Women's association football central defenders
Women's association football midfielders
La Salle Explorers women's soccer players
People from Owings Mills, Maryland
American women's soccer players
Soccer players from Maryland
American sportspeople of Puerto Rican descent